The Regional League of the Republika Srpska - Center is a fourth level league in the Bosnia and Herzegovina football league system and a third level league in the Republika Srpska.

Member clubs for 2020–21
List of clubs competing in 2020–21 season:
FK Borac - Lužani Bosanski
FK Crvena Zvijezda - Obudovac
FK Hajduk - Batkuša
FK Hajduk - Kožuhe
FK Naša Krila - Kostajnica
FK Ozren - Petrovo
FK Rudanka - Rudanka
FK Skugrić - Skugrić
FK Sloga - Dugo Polje
FK Sloga - Jakeš
FK Trebava - Osječani
FK Ukrina - Čečava
FK Vranjak - Vranjak
FK Vučijak - Majevac
FK Željezničar - Doboj
FK Zvijezda - Kakmuž

References

4
Bos
3